The Council of Jerusalem of 536 was a meeting of Chalcedonian representatives of the church of the Three Palestines (Prima, Secunda, Tertia) to condemn certain persons accused of the Monophysite heresy. It was convoked at the initiative the Roman emperor Justinian I following the forced resignation of the Patriarch Anthimus I of Constantinople in February or March, an event in which Pope Agapetus I had played the main role.

Following the Council of Constantinople in May–June 536, Patriarch Menas of Constantinople wrote to Patriarch Peter of Jerusalem urging him to hold a council of the Three Palestines to condemn the same heretics as had Constantinople: Anthimus, Severus of Antioch, Zaʿūra the Stylite and Peter of Apamea. The emperor also sent a letter. These letters were delivered by the monks of the Judaean Desert who had traveled to Constantinople to take part in the council there. Since Jerusalem had only been raised to a patriarchate by the Council of Chalcedon in 451, the authority of the bishop of the city over the church in the Three Palestines was not accepted by anti-Chalcedonians.

The council met on 19 September 536 in Jerusalem (formally Aelia Capitolina). It conducted its business in Greek. Its acts are preserved in the collection known as the Collectio Sabbaitica. The verdicts of the Council of Constantinople were read into the record and the assembled clergy at Jerusalem discussed all four condemned clerics. Their own verdict, however, only explicitly condemned Anthimus. It was subscribed by 47 bishops, which was almost every bishop in the Three Palestines. There is no logical sequence to the subscriptions and they were all made in Greek.

List of signatory bishoprics
The list of 47 bishops appears to be nearly complete for the Three Palestines. Among the known sees of ancient Palestine, only the bishoprics of Diospolis, Maiuma of Ascalon, Maiuma of Gaza and Zoara were probably in existence in 536 and are unrepresented in the subscriptions.

Notes

Bibliography

536
530s in the Byzantine Empire
Jerusaalem
Medieval Jerusalem
Christianity in Jerusalem